John V. Soto is an Australian film director.

Soto won Best Director for his film "The Reckoning" at the 2014 British Independent Film Festival where the film had its UK premiere at Leicester Square on 9 May 2014. He has written and directed the feature films Crush (2009), starring Christopher Egan, Needle (2010), starring Travis Fimmel and Ben Mendelsohn and The Reckoning (2014), starring Jonathan LaPaglia and Luke Hemsworth, which was released in Australia on 5 September 2014 after premiering at CinefestOZ on 29 August. The Reckoning had its Australian TV Premiere on 7 December 2015 on Channel ONE (Network TEN). Soto is the co-founder of Filmscope Entertainment, with Deidre Kitcher.

Soto's latest feature film, a Sci-Fi Thriller titled The Gateway (2017), stars Jacqueline McKenzie. The film was selected for FilmQuest film festival in 2017, an event which celebrates Sci-Fi, Fantasy and Horror films. The Gateway was selected for the Austin Revolution Festival in 2017 where it won in the Best Feature Director category, as well as being nominated for Best Film, Best Director, Best Cinematography and Best Screenplay. Previously, Soto won Best Director at The British Independent Film Festival in 2014 for his feature film The Reckoning, a thriller starring Luke Hemsworth. The film was also selected for the official line-up at Cannes Cinephiles des Antipodes where it screened theatrically in May 2015. Soto won the Special Jury Prize for Needle at the Melbourne Underground Film Festival in 2011, and was also selected for the 2010 US horror film festival SCREAMFEST, where it won for best makeup effects.

Career

Filmscope Entertainment is a production company based in Western Australia that makes commercial genre films. Notable works include The Gateway (2017), The Reckoning (2014), Needle (2010), and Crush (2009). 

In 2010, Soto wrote and directed Needle, a Supernatural Thriller starring Ben Mendolsohn, Trilby Glover and Michael Dorman, which partnering with Lightning Entertainment, sold internationally.  "Needle" was released on 62 screens in Turkey where it landed at No. 4 at the box office on 29 July 2011 and ran for 13 weeks. The film was acquired by Sony for Australia and had a limited theatrical release on 8 screens before its home entertainment release. Needle won numerous awards at various film festivals including Best Cinematography and Best Special Effects at the British Horror Film Festival, and Best Makeup Special Effects at SCREAMFEST, and at the Melbourne Underground Film Festival where Soto won the Special Jury Prize.

Soto's 2009 film Crush, which he wrote and co-directed, was sold in 54 countries. Soto has written the script of Prey (2009)  and in 2007 he directed a short film called Repulsion.

Filmography

Awards and nominations

References

External links
 Official website for Filmscope Entertainment

Australian film directors
Horror film directors
Living people
Year of birth missing (living people)